40 Golden Greats is a compilation album by Cliff Richard made up of his biggest hit songs from the start of his music career (with his original backing band The Shadows) through to his most recent solo hits of the time. The double album was released on EMI Records in September 1977 and reached number one on the UK Albums Chart.

Track listing

Album 1
Side A

Side B

Album 2
Side A

Side B

Charts and certifications

Weekly charts

Year-end charts

Certifications

References 

1977 compilation albums
Cliff Richard compilation albums
EMI Records compilation albums